Keszthelyi is a Hungarian surname. Keszthely is a Hungarian city. Notable people with the surname include:

Ferenc Keszthelyi (1928–2010), Hungarian Roman Catholic Bishop Emeritus 
Rita Keszthelyi (born 1991), Hungarian water polo player
Rudolf Keszthelyi
Szvetlana Keszthelyi
Tibor Keszthelyi
Vivien Keszthelyi

Hungarian-language surnames
Toponymic surnames